Joshua Mark Sussman is an American actor, best known for his role as Hugh Normous in Wizards of Waverly Place and his role as recurring antagonist Jacob Ben Israel in Glee. He also had a minor role on the Nickelodeon TV series Drake & Josh as Clayton.

Biography
Sussman was raised in a Jewish family in Teaneck, New Jersey. He studied acting for two years at the School for Film and Television in New York City, an intense Meisner technique-based program. In the winter of 2008/2009 he took part in Birthright Israel. He resides in Los Angeles.

Filmography

References

External links

Male actors from New Jersey
American male child actors
American male film actors
Place of birth missing (living people)
American male television actors
Jewish American male actors
Living people
People from Teaneck, New Jersey
21st-century American Jews
Year of birth missing (living people)